is a comic, satirical poem in Scots by William Dunbar (born 1459 or 1460) composed in the early sixteenth century.
The title may be rendered in modern English as A Ballad of The False Friar of Tongland, How He Fell in the Mire Flying to Turkey.

The poem mocks an apparent attempt by John Damian, the abbott of Tongland, to fly from a wall of Stirling Castle using a pair of artificial wings. While pillorying this event, Dunbar makes a broader attack on Damian's character, depicting him as a habitual charlatan.

The text of the poem is preserved in the Bannatyne Manuscript and, partially, in the Asloan Manuscript.

Historical context
John Damian was an Italian-born cleric who came to Scotland, at the start of the sixteenth century and became a protégé of King James IV. From 1501 he is recorded receiving payments from the King and is referred to as "The French Leich" and "The French Medicinar", suggesting that he practised medicine in some form. He was made abbot of Tongland Abbey in Kirkcudbrightshire. His involvement with the natural sciences is confirmed by the alchemical experiments he carried out, at the King's expense, in Stirling in 1503.

William Dunbar was a makar who was also close to James IV. In his youth, he had accompanied diplomatic missions to France and England and from 1500 was employed at the Royal court, often writing poetry which dealt with courtly events. Dunbar's poem The Birth of Antichrist seems to be a second satire of John Damian with its reference to a flying abbot clothed in feathers.

Damian's career was described by the later historian John Lesley.

Lesley records that, in 1507, Damian declared that he would travel to France by flight faster than a recently departed Scots embassy. He then leapt from a wall wearing his feathered costume and landed heavily, breaking a femur.

He then records that Damian explained his failure to achieve flight thus;

or, in English:

''he ascribed the blame to the fact that there were some hen feathers in the wings which yearn for and covet the midden and not the sky.

Lesley compares Damian's exploit to a mythical King Bladud, but no further explanation for the Abbot's actions is given.

The poem

"The Fenyeit Freir of Tungland" is composed in verse in the form of a dream vision and forms a supposed biography of John Damian up to and including his attempt at flight. The tone of the poem is consistently humorous and scurrilous. Passages of fanciful fiction are mixed with elements of truth, albeit exaggerated for comic effect. In these respects it bears a strong resemblance in style to the contemporary literary form of flyting.

Synopsis
The poem opens in formal, aureate style, with Dunbar declaring that, at dawn, he had a dream.

The mood quickly becomes scurrilous. Although he will never be explicitly named, John Damian appears in the dream and is described as having Turkish origins,

Damian is accused of having killed a cleric in Italy in order to acquire his habit and so impersonate him. This seems to be the origin of the epithet .

Damian is then supposed to have fled from Lombardy to France once his true identity was discovered. There, he pretended to be a physician, hiding his Italian origins.

He is then accused of having no skill in bloodletting and being obliged to flee again.

He arrives in Scotland, where he continues his medical malpractice.

It is suggested that, after being appointed as an abbot, he neglected his religious duties in favour of alchemy.

After the failure of his alchemical work, he decides to fly back to Turkey with a coat of feathers. He takes off, observed by marvelling birds who compare him to mythical characters.

The birds attack. During an extended descriptive passage, each species adopts a different tactic. They peck him, claw him, pluck his hair and tear at his wings.

In a particularly scatological detail, the panic-stricken Damian loses control of his bowels above a herd of cattle,

Deprived by the birds of his "plumage", he falls into a midden, "sliding up to the eyes in muck".

Damian hides in the mud for three days while the carrion birds search for him.

Dunbar is then woken by the dawn chorus. To his frustration, his vision of Damian is "taken with the tide".

Interpretation

It is unclear how much of the poem is truthful and how much is exaggeration or fiction.

Certain episodes, such as the long and elaborate description of Damian's attack by a flock of outraged birds, are obvious fantasy.

Some of Dunbar's details are however corroborated by other documents. Principally, the Treasurer's accounts confirm that John Damian did indeed practice medicine and also dabbled in alchemy. Bishop Lesley's history gives further corroboration.

Dunbar's clear intention is to mock his target by any means available and so the reader must be the final judge of what is true and false in the poem.

References 

Poetry by William Dunbar
Scottish poems
Scottish literature
Medieval poetry
Poetry of the Bannatyne Manuscript